Bytyń may refer to the following places:
Bytyń, Greater Poland Voivodeship (west-central Poland)
Bytyń, Lublin Voivodeship (east Poland)
Bytyń, West Pomeranian Voivodeship (north-west Poland)